Saifuddin Azizi (12 March 1915 – 24 November 2003), also known as Seypidin Azizi, Saif al-Dīn ʿAzīz, Saifuding Aizezi and Saifuding, was the first chairman of the Xinjiang Uyghur Autonomous Region of the People's Republic of China.

Biography
Azizi was born in Tacheng to an influential Uyghur trader family originally from Artux (Artush). He attended school in Xinjiang and then moved to the Soviet Union, joining the Communist Party of the Soviet Union (CPSU) and studying at the Central Asia Political Institute in Tashkent. He returned to Xinjiang as a Soviet agent, instigating the Soviet-backed Ili Rebellion against the Republic of China government in northwest Xinjiang. He served as Minister of Education in the Second East Turkestan Republic and Commissioner of Education in the Zhang Zhizhong Ili Rebel-Kuomintang coalition government from 1945–1948. In September 1949, Saifuddin attended the Chinese People's Political Consultative Conference endorsed by the Chinese Communist Party (CCP), becoming a member of the new Communist government. In October, the 1949 Chinese revolution brought the Communists to power in Xinjiang and in China more generally; at this point, Saifuddin held various posts for Nationalities and Political and Legal Affairs for the new government.

From December 1949 through January 1950, he accompanied Mao Zedong in his trip to Moscow to negotiate the Sino-Soviet Treaty of Friendship and it was there on 27 December 1949 where he quit the CPSU and joined the CCP in accordance with recommendation of Mao himself. In 1955, he was given the rank of Lieutenant General of the PLA. In the same year, he registered with Mao his strong objection to proposals to name Xinjiang the "Xinjiang Autonomous Region", arguing that "autonomy is not given to mountains and rivers. It is given to particular nationalities". As a result, the administrative region would be named "Xinjiang Uyghur Autonomous Region".

Uyghur linguist Ibrahim Muti'i opposed the Second East Turkestan Republic and was against the Ili Rebellion because it was backed by the Soviets and Stalin. Saifuddin Azizi later apologized to Ibrahim and admitted that his opposition to the East Turkestan Republic was the correct thing to do.

At the  Chinese People's Political Consultative Conference (CPPCC) in Beijing, he secured the role of regional Chairman of Xinjiang, a job he kept from 1955 to 1978, with a brief respite during the Cultural Revolution. 
He was a vice chairman of the Standing Committee of the First through Seventh National People's Congress and an alternate member of the Politburo of the Chinese Communist Party of the 10th and 11th CCP Central Committee.
From 1993 to 1998, he served as a vice-chairman of the CPPCC National Committee.  He died of illness at the age of 88.

References 

1915 births
2003 deaths
Uyghur politicians
People from Kizilsu
People's Republic of China politicians from Xinjiang
Chinese Communist Party politicians from Xinjiang
Political office-holders in Xinjiang
Chinese Muslims
Vice Chairpersons of the National People's Congress
Vice Chairpersons of the National Committee of the Chinese People's Political Consultative Conference